Michael Holm (born Lothar Walter; on 29 July 1943) is a German singer, musician, songwriter and record producer. 
He is primarily known as a singer of Schlager music. Although his first appearance in the hit parade was in 1962 ("Lauter Schöne Worte"), he had his first big hit in 1969. "Mendocino", the German adaptation of a song by the Sir Douglas Quintet, was the biggest selling single that year in (Germany). The record was released in September 1969, reached number three for five weeks, selling over a million copies.
Ariola presented him with a gold record in October 1970.

Further hits such as "Barfuß im Regen" (1970), "Tränen lügen nicht" (literally, "Tears Don't Lie", recorded in English as "When A Child Is Born") (1974) and "Musst Du jetzt gerade gehen, Lucille" (1977) followed. He also composed the music for the popular international horror movie Mark of the Devil (1970). Outside of Germany, he is best known for his work as a member of the new age band, Cusco, along with Kristian Schultze.

A year-long artistic collaboration and private friendship connects him with the musician and producer Giorgio Moroder, he even dedicated a song with Giorgio and me. As a duo, they released several singles Spinach and Spinach LP 1.

Albums
1970: Auf der Straße nach Mendocino
1970: Mendocino
1970: Mademoiselle Ninette
1971: Michael Holm 
1972: Meine Songs
1972: I Will Return 
1973: Stories
1973: Spinach 1 (as Spinach)
1975: Tränen lügen nicht – Lieder zum Träumen
1975: Wenn ein Mann ein Mädchen liebt
1975: I'll Return
1976: Greatest Hits
1976: Zwei Gesichter 
1977: Poet der Straße 
1978: Labyrinth 
1979: El Lute 
1980: Halt mich fest
1981: Im Jahr der Liebe 
2004: Liebt Euch!
2007: Mal die Welt 
2010: Holm 2011
2013: 1000 Wege
2017: Als die alten Zeiten jung war'n

Singles
1961: Ich Will Dich Immer Wieder Küssen / Nur Für Verliebte (as Die Missouris)
1961: Sage Mir Nie Goodbye / Bin So Allein (as Die Missouris)
1961: Texas Jimmy / Heute Abend (Da Bin Ich Ein Glücklicher Mann) (as Die Missouris)
1962: Golden Hill (...Und Die Sonne Brannte Heiß) / Grüß Mir Meine Texasbraut (as Die Missouris)
1962: Der King / Wer Hält Das Aus / (as Die Missouris)
1962: Bald Wirst Du Wieder Glücklich Sein / Darum Bleib' Ich Bei Dir
1962: Das Lied Von Der Liebe (Wild In The Country) / Denk Nicht Mehr Daran, O Cowboy
1962: Lauter Schöne Worte / Leider, Leider (Die Sunnies & das Cornel Trio)
1962: Die junge Liebe Ist Süß / Ja, Das Wird Schön Sein (Die Sunnies & das Cornel Trio)
1962: Kannst Du Tanzen / Küss Mich Mal (With Susie Becker)
1962: Gitarren Spielt Auf! / Zwei Gitarren am Meer (Gitarren-Serenade) (as Die Missouris)
1962: Happy Birthday, Josefin / Einmal Werden Wir Uns Wiedersehen
1963: Alles Geld Dieser Welt / So Jung Und Verliebt (and Die Moonlights)
1963: Baby Doll / Liebe Mich Und Geh Mit Mir
1963: Das Muß Die Liebe Sein / Es Kommt Der Tag (and Die Moonlights)
1963: Hello Boys (Er Ist Arm, Sie Ist Reich) / Bossa Nova Baby (as Die Missouris)
1963: Komm In Das Tal Am Colorado / Die Trude Mit Dem Treuen Blick (as Die Missouris)
1964: Komm, Wir Schaun Noch Mal Zu Johnny Rein / Sandy, Sandy (as Die Missouris)
1964: Ciribiribin / Du Gehst Vorbei An Mir (With Cornehlsen Chor)
1964: Alle Wünsche Kann Man Nicht Erfüllen / Es Liegt Nur An Dir (With Alexander Gordan Chor)
1964: Das Kannst Du Mir Nicht Verbieten / Crazy Daisy (& Die Sunnies)
1964: Blue Beat Baby / Hallo Du, Hör Mal Zu! (as Mike & Joe)
1964: Wie Geht's / Ich Möchte Wissen, Was Du Denkst (as Mike & Joe & Die Rebel Guys)
1965: Clap Hands Polka (Sing Tra-La-La) / Das Kann Nicht Sein (as Mike & Joe)
1965: Summer In Hawaii / Die Sonne Grüßt Am Horizont (as Blue Brothers)
1965: Alle Wensen Kan Men Niet Vervullen / Zeg Nimmer Of Nooit
1965: Das Kann Doch Nicht Das Ende Sein / Laß Mich Gehn
1965: Ain't Got No Money / Hokey-Pokey (as The Rebel Guys)
1965: Let's Get Together / I Cry For Cindy (as The Rebel Guys)
1966: So-la-la / Moolah Man (as The Rebel Guys)
1966: S.O.S. - Herz In Not / Der Anfang Vom Ende
1966: Es Kam Wie Der Blitz / Kein Alibi (She Rides With Me)
1966: Wolly Bully / Boys And Girls (as The Hippies)
1967: Heimweh / Ich Kann Dich Nicht Vergessen
1967: 1000 Volt / Flower Power Time
1967: Das Sag Ich Dir, Wenn Wir Allein Sind / Vertrau Auf Mich (as Gary & The Gamblers)
1968: Hippy-Hippy / Love In (as The Hippies)
1968: Muny, Muny, Muny / Friends (as The Daisy Clan)
1968: Mr. Walkie Talkie / Lions In The Tree (as The Daisy Clan)
1968: Billy Vanilly / Hound Dog Bob & Lena (as The Daisy Clan)
1968: Top Secret! / Ich Halt' Zu Dir
1968: Regenprinzessin / Eine Sommernacht
1969: Eine Sommernacht / Days Of Pearly Spencer
1969: Mendocino / Es Könnte Möglich Sein
1969: Mendocino (English Version) / Cutey Girl
1969: Bonnie Bonnie Bonnie / Friends (as The Daisy Clan)
1970: Love Needs Love / Glory Be (as The Daisy Clan)
1970: Madmoiselle Ninette / Sandy
1970: Madmoiselle Ninette (English Version) / Sandy (English Version) (as Mike Holm)
1970: Wie Der Sonnenschein (Shalala Oh Oh) / Sandy
1970: Barfuß Im Regen / Es Tut Weh
1970: America, America / Rhythm Of Love (as Spinach)
1971: San Francisco China Town / Ridin' A Rainbow (as The Daisy Clan)
1971: Action Man (part 1) / Action Man (part 2) (as Spinach)
1971: Ein Verrückter Tag / Mon Amour Diane
1971: That's Right / Mon Amour Diane (English Version)
1971: Dancing In The Sun / Nachts Scheint Die Sonne
1971: Nachts Scheint Die Sonne (Son Of My Father) / Smog In Frankfurt
1972: Let It Happen Tonight / Love Be Good To Me (as The Daisy Clan)
1972: Das Geht Vorüber / Kama Baby (as The Daisy Clan)
1972: (Sweet Sixteen) You Know What I Mean / Knockin' On Your Door (as Spinach)
1972: Du Weinst Um Mich (I Will Return) / Bitte Bleib Ein Bißchen Länger, Mary Ann
1972: I Will Return / You Left One Rainy Evening, Caroline
1972: Es Ist Schön, Bei Dir Zu Sein / Santiago
1972: Gimme, Gimme Your Love / Oh, Oh July
1972: Gimme, Gimme Your Love (English Version) / If You Go (as Mike Holm)
1973: Halte Fest, Den Der Dich Liebt / Leg' Dein Herz Nicht In Den Eisschrank
1973: My Lady Of Spain / Halte Fest, Den Der Dich Liebt
1973: Other Way Round / I'd Love You to Want Me
1973: Baby, Du Bist Nicht Alleine / Giorgio Und Ich
1974: Soleado / Georgio And Me
1974: Nur Ein Kuss, Maddalena / Doch Sie Schaut Immer Vorbei
1974: Mi Dama De España / Other Way Round
1974: Tränen Lügen Nicht / Es Regnet Schon Die Ganze Nacht
1974: When A Child Is Born / The Other Way Round
1975: Kiss Me Kiss Your Baby / Der Sommer Auf Dem Land (as Peppermint)
1975: El Matador / Hello Mama, Hello Papa
1975: Gardenia Blue / Eine Reise Ohne Wiederkehr
1975: I'll Return (Tornero) / A Man Who Loves A Woman
1975: Wart' Auf Mich (Du, Wenn Ich Dich Verlier') (Tornero) / Geh' Doch Heim, Little Girl
1976: Lady Love / Hey Music
1976: Lady Love (English Version) / Hey Music (English Version)
1976: Lass Dein Herz Doch Frei / Ein Großer Garten Ist Diese Welt
1976: Wenn Dein Herz Spricht / Manhattan
1976: Manhattan / Bring Mich Heim, Du Weite Straße
1976: When A Child Is Born / Merry Christmas
1976: Havin´ A Party / Splish Splash
1977: Ask Your Heart / Manhattan (English Version)
1977: Tränen Lügen Nicht / Mendocino
1977: Desperado / Do Ya Love
1977: Colorado (Desperado) / Manhattan
1977: Musst Du Jetzt Grade Gehen, Lucille / Bring Mich Heim, Du Weite Straße
1978: Allein Mit Dir / Zuviel Rauch In Diesem Raum
1978: Traum-Hotel / Liebe Geht Nie Verlor'n
1978: Wer Ist Dein Freund / San Antonio Highway
1978: Saudade / Einer Von Vielen
1979: Ich Weiß, Du Denkst, Ich Bin Ein Schlechter Mensch / Sprich Mit Mir Nicht Über Liebe
1979: El Lute / Wer Lügt, Gewinnt
1979: Wenn Die Zukunft Beginnt / Ohne Pass Keine Arbeit
1980: Kind (Anak) / Samstagabendträumer
1980: Leb Wohl (Vive) / Menschen Ohne Ziel
1981: Ein Junggeselle / Halt Mich Fest
1981: Mit 17 Fängt Das Leben Erst An / Einer Denkt Immer An Dich
1981: So Weit Die Füsse Tragen / Wir
1981: Liebe Braucht Nähe / Die Nacht Hat 1000 Augen
1982: Fällt Der Vorhang Für Uns Zwei / Schlaf Nicht Ein
1984: Einsamkeit Danach / Die Nacht Hat 1000 Augen
1986: Insel Im Strom / Wir
1991: Elektrisiert / Reit Auf Den Wolken
2001: Maddalena 2001 (con Olaf Henning)
2005: Liebt Euch!
2008: Shy Boy (Mestengo) (as Michael Holm And Monty Robert)
2010: Schwarz-Rot-Gold
2011: Märchenprinzen
2011: Sie Ist Eine Kriegerin
2012: Wie Viele Sommer Noch

Collections
1970: Mendocino
1973: Schlager-Rendezvous mit Michael Holm
1974: Alle Wünsche kann man nicht erfüllen
1974: Die großen Erfolge
1974: Seine großen Erfolge
1977: Die goldenen Super 20
1977: Portrait eines Stars
1978: Star Discothek
1980: Seine großen Erfolge [1980]
1982: Das Star Album
1990: Das große deutsche Schlager-Archiv (con Heintje)
1991: Star Collection
1991: Star Portrait
1992: So weit die Füße tragen
1993: Golden Stars
1994: Mendocino [1994]
1994: Große Erfolge
1994: Meine größten Erfolge
1995: Die Singles 1961 bis 1965
1995: Alle Wünsche kann man nicht erfüllen [1995]
1995: Mein Gefühl für Dich
1995: Meine schönsten Erfolge
1995: Szene Star
1997: Tränen lügen Nicht – Seine schönsten Lieder
1999: Das Beste – Die Telefunken-Singles 1961–1965
2000: Golden Stars – The Best Of
2000: Seine großen Erfolge [2000]
2000: Alle Wünsche kann man nicht erfüllen [2000]
2002: Wie der Sonnenschein
2005: Tränen lügen Nicht
2007: Hautnah – Die Geschichten meiner Stars
2007: Seine großen Erfolge [2007]
2009: Dieter Thomas Heck präsentiert: 40 Jahre ZDF Hitparade
2009: Die Schlager Parade
2012: Best Of Michael Holm – Tränen lügen Nicht
2012: Balladen
2013: Bild Schlager Stars
2013: Best Of Michael Holm

References

External links
 Official site
 
 Michael Holm article
 www.youtube.com/user/cuscomusicnet — Cusco video channel on YouTube

1943 births
Living people
Musicians from Szczecin
German male musicians
German male singers
German songwriters
English-language singers from Germany
People from the Province of Pomerania